Edward Mauro Zenteno  (born December 5, 1984) is a Bolivian football central defender currently playing for Club Jorge Wilstermann. He has played for the national team of his country for several years.

External links
 Statistics at BoliviaGol.com 
 

1984 births
Living people
Sportspeople from Cochabamba
Bolivian footballers
Association football defenders
Club Aurora players
The Strongest players
C.D. Jorge Wilstermann players
Bolivia international footballers
2015 Copa América players